Raw and Live is a two disc live album ostensibly by the English punk rock band Sex Pistols that was released in 2004. However, Disc 2 is a Vicious White Kids concert, the band featuring Sid Vicious, Glen Matlock, Steve New, and Rat Scabies.

Track listing
Disc 1
"Pretty Vacant"
"No Feelings"
"I Wanna Be Me"
"I'm a Lazy Sod"
"Submission"
"C'mon Everybody"
"Search and Destroy"
"Anarchy in the U.K."
"Satellite"
"No Lip"
"Bill Grundy Interview" (Dialogue)
  
Disc 2 – live at the Electric Ballroom, London, 1978
"Somethin' Else"
"C'mon Everybody"
"Stepping Stone"
"No Lip"
"I Wanna Be Your Dog"
"Belsen Was a Gas"
"Chatterbox"
"Tight Pants"
"My Way"
"Search and Destroy"
"My Way"

References

Sex Pistols live albums
2004 live albums